Débo Club de Mopti is a football team based in the city of Mopti, in the African nation of Mali.

The team last played in the top Malian league, the Malien Premiere Division in the 2007/2008 season, after which they relegated.

History

Achievements
 Malien Premiere Division ''' Malien Cup:  Mali SuperCup: '''

References
 http://www.footmali.com (Le football au Mali)

Football clubs in Mali
Mopti